Jonkheer Constant Wilhelm Feith (August 3, 1884, in The Hague – September 15, 1958, in Bennekom) was a Dutch amateur football player who competed with great success in the 1912 Summer Olympics.

Club career
He played the majority of his career for HVV, then the top side in The Hague, amassing a stunning 235 goals in 350 matches.

International career
Feith made his debut for the Netherlands in an April 1906 match against Belgium and earned a total of 8 caps, scoring 2 goals. He was part of the incredible Dutch team, which won the bronze medal in the football tournament at the 1912 Summer Olympics. His final international was in July 1912 at the Olympics against Finland.

He also made it to the Netherlands national cricket team.

Personal life
Feith was a judge by profession and worked in the Dutch East Indies, where he was detained by the Japanese during World War II.

References

External links

 KNVB profile - OnsOranje

1884 births
1958 deaths
Footballers from The Hague
Association football forwards
Dutch footballers
Netherlands international footballers
Footballers at the 1912 Summer Olympics
Olympic bronze medalists for the Netherlands
Olympic footballers of the Netherlands
Olympic medalists in football
Medalists at the 1912 Summer Olympics
World War II civilian prisoners held by Japan
Dutch nobility
20th-century Dutch judges